Dinner at Tiffani's is an American food-based television series on the Cooking Channel that premiered on February 25, 2015. The show follows host Tiffani Thiessen preparing dinner with a different group of celebrity friends each episode.

The ten-episode first season was developed following a one-hour special under the same title, which aired on March 23, 2014. The pilot episode was available to stream free from February 9, 2015, more than two weeks before the television series premiere. The program was renewed for a 16-episode second season which began broadcast in 2016. The third and final season aired starting in January 2017.

Season 1 (2015)

Season 2 (2016)

Season 3 (2017)

References

External links
 
 

2010s American cooking television series
2015 American television series debuts
Cooking Channel original programming
English-language television shows